Andrew Swann may refer to:
Andrew Swann (footballer) (1878–?), Scottish footballer
S. Andrew Swann, American science fiction and fantasy author
Andrew Swann, game developer for Twilight

See also
Andrew Swan (born 1968), politician in Manitoba, Canada
Andy Swan (baseball) (1858–?), baseball first baseman